Saeed Karimian (8 August 1972 – 29 April 2017) was an Iranian television executive, the founder, chairman, and owner of Dubai-based  GEM TV, which runs 17 Persian-language TV channels, plus one each in Kurdish, Azeri, and Arabic. Karimian, who was British national, had been tried in absentia by a court in Tehran, and sentenced to a prison term of six years for spreading propaganda against Iran.

Assassination of Saeed Karimian
Karimian was shot dead in Istanbul, Turkey, on 29 April 2017, along with his Kuwaiti business partner. According to the exiled Iranian opposition group National Council of Resistance, Karimian was assassinated by the Revolutionary Guard on the orders of Ayatollah Ali Khamenei, the country’s Supreme Leader. In May 2017, Turkish media reported that two people accused for the assassination of Karimian were arrested in Serbia with fake passports on their way to Iran.

References

1972 births
2017 deaths
People murdered in Turkey
Iranian people murdered abroad
Iranian emigrants to the United Kingdom
Iranian expatriates in Turkey
Iranian businesspeople
Iranian mass media owners
Iranian media executives
Volunteer Basij personnel of the Iran–Iraq War